D-TV was a series of music videos created by The Walt Disney Company and produced by Charles Braverman and edited by Ted Herrmann which premiered on May 5, 1984, by taking hit songs of the past and putting them together with various footage of vintage Disney animation, created out of the trend of music videos on cable channel MTV, which inspired the name of this series. Most songs used were contemporary hits (e.g., Hall and Oates' "Private Eyes"), though older songs like Sheb Wooley's '50s hit "The Purple People Eater" were also featured. The videos were shown as filler material on Disney Channel (as the network did not air commercials at this time), as well as being the focus of television specials. Home video collections were also released on VHS, Beta, CED Videodisc, and Laserdisc formats. After the first run of D-TV, in 1989 a second series was produced known as DTV². The main title music, known as "RPM", was created in 1981 by a recording company called Network Music. When the segments were shown individually on television, the title music used was from "Sunset Boulevard", also by Network Music. In the opening of D-TV, a cheese-like moon zooms out to reveal a black background with blue musical notes. A silhouette of Mickey Mouse's head rises from the moon, and the moon exits below the screen. The letter D (in the corporate Disney font) and the letters TV appear and zoom out to attach Mickey Mouse's head. Finally, after a few seconds, we zoom into Mickey Mouse's head and revealing several vintage Disney cartoon clips.

D-TV ceased airing in the early 2000s.

Home media 
Many of the songs listed above were released on VHS, in five separate volumes. The first three volumes "Pop & Rock", "Rock, Rhythm & Blues", and "Golden Oldies" were released in late 1984, as part of Walt Disney Home Video's "Wrapped and Ready to Give" promotion. Following that, two more videos, "Love Songs" and "Groovin' For a '60s Afternoon", were released during the summer of 1985.

Television specials 
Disney aired three DTV television specials on NBC in 1986 and 1987: DTV Valentine (Feb 14, 1986, re-titled DTV Romancin in later airings) (including 3 songs from Disney Sing-Along Songs, DTV Doggone Valentine (including Siamese Cat song from Disney Sing-Along Songs) (Feb 13, 1987), and DTV Monster Hits (including Heffalumps and Woozles from Disney Sing-Along Songs) (Oct 30, 1987).

 DTV Valentine 
DTV Valentine focused on love and romance music.

Songs
Betty Everett: The Shoop Shoop Song (It's in His Kiss)
Stevie Wonder: I Just Called to Say I Love You
Madonna: Dress You Up
Stray Cats: Rock This Town
Lionel Richie: Hello
Desiree Goyette: Hey Mickey
Elton John & Kiki Dee: Don't Go Breaking My Heart
Bella Notte (from Lady and the Tramp) (song lyrics on-screen)
Elvis Presley: (Let Me Be Your) Teddy Bear
Eurythmics: There Must Be an Angel (Playing with My Heart)
Once Upon a Dream (from Sleeping Beauty) (song lyrics on-screen)
Huey Lewis and the News: The Heart of Rock & Roll
The Contours: Do You Love Me
Someday My Prince Will Come (from Snow White and the Seven Dwarfs) (song lyrics on-screen)
Whitney Houston: You Give Good Love

 Voice Characterizations 

 Tony Anselmo - Donald Duck
 Corey Burton - Gruffi Gummi
 Eddie Carroll - Jiminy Cricket
 Mary Costa - Princess Aurora (archive footage)
 Paul Frees - Ludwig Von Drake, Announcer
 Les Perkins - Mickey Mouse
 Will Ryan - Goofy, Pongo
 Judith Searle - Chip and Dale
 Bill Shirley - Prince Phillip (archive footage)
 Lisa St. James - Dalmatian puppies

 DTV Doggone Valentine 
DTV Doggone Valentine focused on love songs with a tribute to Disney's dog and cat characters.

Songs
Wham!: Wake Me Up Before You Go-Go
John Travolta & Olivia Newton-John: You're The One That I Want
The Flamingos: I Only Have Eyes For You
Huey Lewis and The News: Working For A Livin'
Bee Gees: Stayin' Alive
Kenny Rogers: Lady
Patti Page: How Much Is That Doggie In The Window?
"Weird Al" Yankovic: Eat It
George Thorogood and The Destroyers: Bad to the Bone
Paul Anka: Puppy Love
The Siamese Cat Song (from Lady and the Tramp) (song lyrics on-screen)
The Soul Survivors: Expressway To Your Heart
Stray Cats: Stray Cat Strut
Marvin Gaye: I'll Be Doggone
Deniece Williams: Let's Hear It for the Boy
Maurice Williams and The Zodiacs: Stay

 Voice Characterizations 

 Wayne Allwine - Mickey Mouse
 Albert Ash - Ludwig Von Drake
 Eddie Carroll - Jiminy Cricket
 Bill Farmer - Goofy
 Maurice LaMarche - Awards Show MC
 Will Ryan - Pongo
 J. J. Jackson - Announcer
 Lisa St. James - Dalmatian puppies
 Russi Taylor - Minnie Mouse, Dalmatian puppies

 DTV Monster Hits 
DTV Monster Hits was focused on Halloween-themed music and footage. It was also referred to as Disney's DTV Monster Hits by the show's narrator, Gary Owens. By this time, Hans Conried had died and the duties of the Magic Mirror, now credited at the end of the show as Man in the Magic Mirror played by Jeffrey Jones.

Songs
Michael Jackson: Thriller
Ray Parker, Jr.: Ghostbusters
Creedence Clearwater Revival: Bad Moon Rising
Bobby "Boris" Pickett featuring The Crypt-Kickers: Monster Mash
Rockwell: Somebody's Watching Me
Electric Light Orchestra: Evil Woman
Stevie Wonder: Superstition
Pat Benatar: You Better Run
Spike Jones and His City Slickers: That Black Old Magic
Daryl Hall: Dreamtime
The Many Adventures of Winnie the Pooh: Heffalumps & Woozles (song lyrics on-screen)
The Eurythmics: Sweet Dreams (Are Made of This)

Voice Characterizations
Wayne Allwine - Mickey Mouse
Tony Anselmo - Donald Duck
Stuart Buchanan - The Huntsman (archive footage)
Adriana Caselotti - Snow White (archive footage)
Bing Crosby - Brom Bones (archive footage)
Bill Farmer - Goofy
June Foray - Witch Hazel, Pauline
Sterling Holloway - Winnie the Pooh (archive footage)
Barrie Ingham - Basil of Baker Street (archive footage)
Jeffrey Jones - Magic Mirror
Maurice LaMarche - Leslie J. Clark
Gary Owens - Announcer
Vincent Price - Ratigan (archive footage)
Lucille La Verne - The Evil Queen (archive footage)
Paul Winchell - Tigger (archive footage)

Notes
 June Foray returned as the voice of Witch Hazel' to dub new lines. These can be seen when she introduces Michael Jackson and during the segment where she is reading a book about scary stories, which is a segment lifted directly from a Disneyland episode, The Mad Hermit of Chimney Butte.
 New lines for Donald Duck were dubbed during the Ghostbusters theme, where he says he's not afraid of ghosts is a new line.

References 

Music videos
Disney Channel original programming
Disney television films
1984 American television series debuts
Television series by Disney